Express Oil Change & Tire Engineers is an American automotive maintenance brand, with services including its signature 10 minute oil change, in addition to full-service mechanical, tires, brakes, and more general service offerings. The company is headquartered in Birmingham, AL, where it was founded in 1979.

History 
In 1979, Express Oil Change was founded by Jim Lunceford, opening the first store in Birmingham, AL. By 1984, Lunceford had opened a total of four locations before deciding to franchise the company.

In 1996, Ricky Brooks and Joe Watson, who were the largest franchisees at the time with 14 locations, were approached by Lunceford to see if the two would be interested in buying the business. They agreed, and immediately had ownership of 25 of the 48 stores in the chain.

Continued Growth & Private-Equity 
In 1998, Express Oil Change purchased Tune-Up Clinics – a 28-store chain based in Atlanta, GA, with 25 of the locations immediately being rebranded to Express Oil Change.

In 2005, Carousel Capital, a private investment firm based in Charlotte, NC, purchased the majority stake in Express Oil Change, while Brooks and Watson remained as CEO and COO. By this time, Express Oil Change and its franchisees operated 149 centers across Alabama, Georgia, Tennessee, Mississippi, Florida and South Carolina.

In 2010, Carousel sold its stake in the company to Thompson Street Capital Partners of St. Louis, MO. By this time, Express Oil Change  operated 172 company- and franchise-owned locations across 10 states.

In 2013, as Express Oil Change had expanded to nearly 200 locations across 13 states, Carousel Capital reacquired the company from Thompson Street. Expresst acquired Birmingham-based Tire Engineers, a company with seven locations.

By February 2014, Express had co-branded 20 of its 88 corporate stores to Express Oil Change & Tire Engineers, with plans to rebrand the remaining locations, and offering the 112 franchise locations the opportunity to rebrand as well. The Tire Engineers stores would not be offered as a franchise model, nor would the stand-alone tire stores be co-branded. The combined company acquired additional tire brands: Savannah Tire, Trax Tires, Upton Tire, Epperly Tire, among others.

In June 2017, Express Oil Change & Tire Engineers, which had become the 10th-largest fast lube chain in the United States, was acquired by San Francisco-based private equity firm Golden Gate Capital. Shortly thereafter, in November 2017, Express acquired Brakes Plus of Denver, CO. The Brakes Plus stores would not be offered as a franchise model, nor be rebranded.

In February 2018, Golden Gate announced a merger of Express Oil Change & Tire Engineers and Brakes Plus with its newly-acquired Mavis Discount Tire of Millwood, NY, thus creating one of the largest automotive maintenance providers in the United States, known as Mavis Tire Express Services Corp.  

In November 2020, the merging of Town Fair Tire Centers and Mavis Tire Express Services with Town Fair Tire of East Haven, CT was announced; Town Fair was then the 14th-largest independent tire dealer in the US, with 101 locations across six states .

Mavis Discount Tire

Mavis Tire Supply LLC. is an American chain of automotive service centers headquartered in Millwood, New York.

History
Mavis Discount Tire was founded in 1949  as Vic's Cycle Shop by brothers Marion and Victor Sorbaro. The business repaired bicycles sold from a neighboring  toy shop. The shop quickly grew in popularity due to performing difficult bicycle repairs. 

In 1968, due to the success of the business, Marion and Victor built a 7,000 square foot tire center, also located in Millwood. By 1971 the chain grew to three stores. The operating name was changed to Mavis Tire Supply in 1972, due to corporate wanting "a more professional image". The name Mavis is derived from the first two letters of the brothers names, and the first letter of their last name (Marion and Victor Sorbaro)

In March 2021, the combined company of Mavis Tire Express Services was acquired by an investor group led by BayPine, TSG Consumer Partners and West First Management. The previous lead financial partner, Golden Gate Capital, also retained a minority interest in the company. As of March 2021, the company operates over 1,100 locations across the Northeast, Midwest and Southern United States.

References

External links
 Express Oil website
 Mavis Tire Discount  website

American companies established in 1979
Retail companies established in 1979
Automotive repair shops of the United States
Companies based in Alabama
Companies based in Birmingham, Alabama
1979 establishments in Alabama
Private equity portfolio companies